Double Take was a female pop duo consisting of Drew Garrett and Lauren Willey. They are mostly known for their single "Hot Problems". Both girls attended San Luis Obispo High School during the period in which "Hot Problems" was released.

Spread and reception of "Hot Problems"

The song was released on YouTube on April 15, 2012. On April 17, 2012, the "Hot Problems" music video was shown on the Internet humor blog Tosh.0 and several other news sites. The next day, the song was released on iTunes. Since its release, it has been dubbed "the worst song of 2012" and "the worst song ever". Some called the song worse than Rebecca Black's "Friday". The video went viral, attaining over 13 million views by June 1, 2012. The song also faced overwhelmingly negative reception; it received numerous negative comments, and its music video reached 690,957 dislikes and 61,280 likes on YouTube by November 16, 2013. Old Bailey Productions, producer of "Hot Problems" stated, "[It] did not create any of the audio or lyrics for this video. [It] produced the video as a favor for a younger sibling of one of [their] friends." In May 2012, a "Bad Lip Reading" version of the song, titled "Time to Rock", was released on the Internet with at least one website saying it is much better than the original.

Willey and Garrett's responses
On ABC Willey and Garrett claimed, "[they] don't think that [they]'re that hot," contrary to the lyrics in their song, and that they are "open" to a career as songwriters. According to them, the purpose of the song was entertainment and to show something to their friends while the lyrics were not meant seriously. "We knew that we couldn't actually sing, so we decided to go for more of a talking singing," Garrett said. Willey said, "All negative criticism we're brushing off our shoulders."

"Like a Princess," "The Stalking Song," and "The Stalking Song Remix"
On May 28, 2012, the pair released their second music video, "Like a Princess". Once again, the song generated extremely negative reception. Their third single, "The Stalking Song", was released on iTunes and YouTube, but has not received a music video.

On July 12, 2012, Double Take published the song "The Stalking Song Remix".

References

Internet memes
American Internet celebrities
People from San Luis Obispo, California
Musical groups established in 2012
Musical groups from California
American musical duos
2012 establishments in California